Half Nelson may refer to:

 Half nelson, a wrestling hold
 Half Nelson (album), a 1985 album by Willie Nelson
 Half Nelson (TV series), a 1985 TV series starring Joe Pesci
 Halfnelson (band), an American rock band, later renamed Sparks
 Halfnelson (album), a 1971 album by the band
 Half Nelson (film), a 2006 film starring Ryan Gosling and Shareeka Epps
 "Half Nelson", a composition by Miles Davis from Savoy 951

See also
 Halfnelson, an early name of the band Sparks
 Halfnelson (album), or Sparks, a 1971 album by the band